The Legend of Awesomest Maximus (released in some regions as National Lampoon's 301) is a 2011 American comedy film directed by Jeff Kanew, starring Will Sasso. It was released theatrically on August 5, 2011. It was released on DVD on March 20, 2012.

Cast
 Will Sasso as Awesomest Maximus
 Kristanna Loken as Hottessa
 Sophie Monk as Princess Ellen
 Khary Payton as King Erotic
 Ian Ziering as Testiclees
 Gary Lundy as Orlando
 Rip Torn as King Looney
 Nelson Frazier, Jr. as Ginormous
 Tony Cox as Minorities
 Blake Anderson cameo as a stoner greek soldier.

Production

References

External links
 
 

National Lampoon films
2011 comedy films
Films set in ancient Greece
2011 films
American comedy films
Films directed by Jeff Kanew
2010s English-language films
2010s American films